is a Japanese snowboarder. Generally, he is called .

He is from Yoichi, Hokkaido. He was promoted to a professional at the age of 21. In Japan, he is recognized as one of the best snowboarders at ground-tricks, commonly called "buttering" in the west. He acted as a chairperson of  until 2006. He and his teammate, Hirohisa Sato have both made appearances in many books.

Now, he works with a small Japanese snowboarding brand called "011 Artistic".

References

External links
011 Artistic official website
Youtube Video
Youtube Video 2
Youtube Video 3
Youtube Video (29 valuable technique of ground tricks)

Japanese male snowboarders
1971 births
Sportspeople from Hokkaido
People from Yoichi, Hokkaido
Living people